The 32nd Grey Cup was played on November 25, 1944, before 3,871 fans at Civic Stadium in Hamilton, Ontario.

The St. Hyacinthe-Donnacona Navy defeated the Hamilton Flying Wildcats 7–6.

External links
 
 

Grey Cup
Grey Cup
Grey Cups hosted in Hamilton, Ontario
1944 in Ontario
November 1944 sports events
20th century in Hamilton, Ontario